H1 Inc. is an global healthcare data technology company founded in 2017, and headquartered in New York City. The company's database is used by healthcare and pharmaceutical companies and related organizations to identify healthcare professionals to partner with on research in order to accelerate development of drugs and other treatments. The company has over 400 employees worldwide and about 100 clients including pharmaceutical companies Novartis and AstraZeneca as of November 2021.

History 
The company was founded by Ariel Katz and Ian Sax in November 2017 as H1 Insights. The company started by helping biotech and pharma companies connect with Key Opinion Leaders (KOLs) to advance research, drug development, and other treatments. According to Katz, the company is named for "the statistical representation of a true hypothesis", often expressed as H, as opposed to a null hypothesis, expressed as H.

In 2018, the company launched its first market offering, Da Vinci, and subsequently participated in Y Combinator's Winter 2020 batch.

In August 2021, H1 acquired Portland, Oregon startup Carevoyance. By November 2021, H1 had over 100 clients including Novartis and AstraZeneca and over 400 employees worldwide.

In February 2022, H1 acquired London-based Faculty Opinions, a discovery tool for finding relevant published medical research and assessing its quality. Subject matter experts on the platform recommend and share their opinion on the top 1% of the biomedical literature indexed in PubMed. Faculty Opinions currently has over 190,000 individual recommended articles from over 4,000 journals.

Products 

H1's primary product is its database which includes 160 million peer-reviewed publications, 350,000 clinical trials, 8 billion medical claims, as well as related data points. Data sources include public databases and contributions by its clients and healthcare providers. Clients include pharmaceutical, biotech, financial, data and healthcare organizations. A companion product, H1 Explorer, was introduced in 2021 allowing healthcare professionals to manage their own profiles in the H1 network.

Its first market offering, Da Vinci, launched in 2018 and is intended to help pharma companies accelerate the market research phase of drug development. H1's Trial Landscape product was introduced in September 2021 to help pharmaceutical companies identify the right sites and physician investigators for a trial.

Funding 
H1 has raised more than $200M in funding in three rounds:

 Series C: $100 million led by Altimeter Capital in November 2021, and $33 million in an extension round led by Goldman Sachs Asset Management, Menlo Ventures, Transformation Capital and Novartis Pharma AG in 2022.  

 Series B: $58 million co-led by IVP and Menlo Ventures in December 2020

 Series A: $12.9 million led by Menlo Ventures in April 2020

Other investors include Joe Montana, Novartis, Baron Davis, Y Combinator, and Underscore VC.

References

External links 
 

American companies established in 2017
Drug discovery companies
Health care companies based in New York (state)
Medical databases
Medical technology companies of the United States